The Shipman 28, also sold as the Baltic 28, is a Swedish sailboat that was designed by Olle Enderlein as a cruiser and first built in 1969.

Production
The design was built by Shipman Sweden AB, Visby and Albin Marine, all in Sweden and Fiberman Composite Racing Products in the Republic of Ireland. About 1,000 boats were completed between 1969 and 1979, but it is now out of production.

The boat was also built by Baltic Marine and sold as the Baltic 28.

Design

The Shipman 28 is a recreational keelboat, built predominantly of fibreglass. It has a masthead sloop rig with aluminum spars, a deck-stepped mast, wire standing rigging and a single set of unswept spreaders. The hull has a spooned raked stem; a raised counter, reverse transom; a skeg-mounted rudder controlled by a tiller and a fixed fin keel. It displaces  and carries  of ballast.

The design has sleeping accommodation for four people, with a double "V"-berth in the bow cabin, a straight settee in the main cabin and an aft cabin with a single berth on the starboard side. The galley is located on the port side at the companionway ladder. The galley is equipped with a two-burner stove and a single stainless steel sink. A dinette table is opposite the galley, on the starboard side. The head is located just aft of the bow cabin on the starboard side.

The saloon has  of headroom and the aft cabin .

Operational history
The boat is supported by an active class club based in Denmark, that organizes racing events, the Shipman 28 Klubben (English: Shipman 28 Club).

See also
List of sailing boat types

References

External links

Video tour of a Shipman 28 (Danish narration)

Keelboats
1960s sailboat type designs
Sailing yachts
Sailboat type designs by Olle Enderlein
Sailboat types built by Albin Marine
Sailboat types built by Shipman Sweden AB
Sailboat types built by Baltic Marine
Sailboat types built by Fiberman Composite Racing Products